Earlston is a census-designated place in West Providence Township, Bedford County, Pennsylvania, in the United States. The population was 1,122 as of the 2010 census. It is located just across the Raystown Branch of the Juniata River from the borough of Everett.

Demographics

References

Populated places in Bedford County, Pennsylvania
Census-designated places in Pennsylvania